"Base Details" is a war poem by the English poet Siegfried Sassoon taking place in the First World War. He wrote it in his diary entry for 4 March 1917. The poem is written about how the staff officers of the British Army (referred to as scarlet majors) send soldiers off to the war front to be killed, while they stay at the Base "Guzzling and gulping in the best hotel" and sending "glum heroes up the line to death". Like  Sassoon's many other poems, "Base Details" is bitterly sarcastic and derisive of the comfortable establishment that supported the  continuation of the war while showing little concern for the people who suffered its consequences. It took place during World War I in France around 1914-1918.

The theme is anger and bitterness. It expresses anger to those who start wars and send their fellow men to their death. The main message is that army officers plan battles from safety of their base, and are usually not involved in the fighting, and therefore does not know the horrors that they are forcing soldiers to face. The first two quartiles are talking about the Majors, in a very sarcastic way, and the last couplet talks about how the war isn't actually a joke, that it is very serious.

Analysis

The major in this poem is cynical, he treats war as if it is a game. 'last scrap.' The major knows nothing of war because he has never been on the frontline. The major is a figure associated with power and privilege. Also, he knows that the meaning of the "last scrap" is how the major thinks of war, a game.

The title of the poem "Base Details"- Base possibly meaning a military base and Details could be a command assignment, someone or something lowly.
"fierce; and bald, and short of breath" this would be a stereotypical World War I officer.

"Glum heroes" refer to the heroes by dying they are unhappy. "Up the line" is the battlefield. "puffy petulant face" is the officer's faces from the excessive eating and drinking. "Guzzling and gulping in the best hotel": The officers eat and drink until their hearts delight while the best hotel refers to them living in the lap of luxury. This also could portray them as acting like monsters and this is what Sassoon intended.

In the second line is the phrase "scarlet major" which is possibly a double entendre . Scarlet (red) has several different meanings.
One reference is to the red tabs that staff officers wore on the lapels of their dress uniforms. These denoted them as non-regimental officers that would never see actual fighting, but work safely in the rear headquarters. 
Another reference is to the red blood on their hands from knowing that they have killed all these people by sending them to the front line. It could also imply that their faces are red from being drunk or that they are very childish, which implies they are ignorant and will do anything to get what they want. Also their faces might be red because they are so obese and they are out of breath from doing nothing.

"Poor Young Chap" this direct speech can be interpreted as that it mimics the Majors as they pretend to care, to get the public on their side, said almost as a matter of routine.
The term "Scrap" can refer to the generals and Majors referring to the war as a game, or "scrap".
"Youth stone dead" a very blunt metaphor which shows the harshness of the author, who isn't impressed.
The last two lines however show how the war is not just a game, and how young boys are being slaughtered for small sections of land that should not be valued the same as people's lives.
"Toddle" refers to the drunk Major and a very good use of satire as it is effective in diminishing the normal view of a major, and "Die" is what Siegfried wants the major to do.
Siegfried Sassoon shows great disgust towards military majors. He is appalled at the way the majors act while men are dying in the battlefield. The majors are fat, insensitive, greedy, vain and very proud, and display no empathy with the soldiers whatsoever. The use of iambic pentameter and a regular rhyming scheme help create a tone of sarcasm. As the topic is serious such an upbeat rhythm would  normally, seem inappropriate except that Sassoon skillfully employs the techniques to satirize the complacent attitude of majors who never have to face the horror of war.

References

Edition

World War I poems
1917 poems
Poems by Siegfried Sassoon
English poems